"Go All the Way" is a single by American rock group Raspberries, released in July 1972 and written by frontman Eric Carmen. The song reached the Top 5 on three principal US charts: number 5 on the Billboard Hot 100, number 4 on Cashbox and number 3 on Record World. The single sold more than 1.3 million copies, earning the band their only certified Gold Record. It was their second single release, their all-time biggest US hit, and appeared on their debut LP, Raspberries.

Carmen has stated that the inspiration for the song was the Rolling Stones' hit, "Let's Spend the Night Together."  Because of its sexually suggestive lyrics, considered risqué for the day, "Go All the Way" was banned by the BBC.

The tune ranked at number 33 on Billboards Top 100 Singles of 1972 year-end list (number 39 on Cashboxs year-end best-sellers countdown). In 1989, Spin magazine named "Go All the Way" in its list of the "100 Greatest Singles of All Time", ranking it at number 91. "Go All the Way" appeared in Blender magazine's July 2006 issue as one of its "Greatest Songs Ever".

Live performances
The song was performed on Don Kirshner's Rock Concert, Live in 1974. 
It was also performed on The Mike Douglas Show, and featured in the set at their 50th anniversary concert in 2007.

Use in media
"Go All the Way" has been featured in three movies. Director Cameron Crowe, a Raspberries fan, used it in his 2000 film Almost Famous. The Killers covered the song for the end credits of the 2012 film Dark Shadows, an adaptation of the 1966–1971 TV series of the same name. The song briefly appears in the 2014 Marvel Studios film Guardians of the Galaxy, and is one of the songs on its soundtrack.

In interviews, hard rock/metal personality Eddie Trunk, states that this song sparked his interest in music due mainly to the distorted guitar riffs.

"Go All the Way" was included on the Raspberries Pop Art Live CD set from their reunion concert recording, November 26, 2004, at the House of Blues in Cleveland, Ohio, released August 18, 2017.

Chart performance

Weekly charts

Year-end charts

Later versions
Matthew Sweet and Bangles member Susanna Hoffs included a faithful rendition of the song in their 2009 collaboration Under the Covers, Vol. 2.

References

External links
 Lyrics of this song
 "Go All the Way" at Songfacts.com
 
 

1972 songs
1972 singles
Raspberries (band) songs
Songs written by Eric Carmen
Song recordings produced by Jimmy Ienner
Rock ballads
The Killers songs
Capitol Records singles
Songs banned by the BBC
Obscenity controversies in music